Guzmania hedychioides is a species of flowering plant in the family Bromeliaceae. This species is endemic to the State of Aragua in Venezuela.

References

hedychioides
Endemic flora of Venezuela
Plants described in 1955